Bulandi Bagh is an area of the archaeological site of Pataliputra (north of railway station of the modern city of Patna). It is mainly known for the discovery of the monumental Pataliputra capital, unearthed in 1895 by L.A. Waddell, as well as the excavation of wooden palissades thought to have formed the protective walls of ancient Pataliputra. Bulandhi Bagh is thought to have been part of the Maurya dynasty royal palace in Pataliputra.

Other excavations in 1912-1913 took place in the area of Bulandi Bagh under American archaeologist David Brainard Spooner, working for the British Archaeological Survey of India. Spooner devoted most of his resources to the site of Kumrahar to the south, but in Bulandi Bagh, he found a wooden palissade, punch-marked coins and terracotta figures (head of smiling boy and dancing figure), and various beads and seals.

In 1926–1927, J.A. Page and M. Ghosh for the Archaeological Survey of India excavated the area again leading to the discovery of large wooden palisades (137 meters were excavated), also thought to be of the Mauryan period. It is thought that it is the palissade seen by Megasthenes during his visit to Pataliputra. Strabo in his Geographia, quoting Megasthenes:

According to Arrian, also quoting Megasthenes:

References

Maurya Empire
Patna
Archaeological sites in Bihar